Tougher Than Leather is the fourth studio album by American hip hop group Run-D.M.C., released on May 17, 1988, by Profile Records. The album was produced by the group members themselves, Davy D. and Rick Rubin.

While the new record did not maintain the same popularity as its predecessor, it obtained platinum status and spawned the favorites "Run's House" and "Mary, Mary". Despite being given a mixed reception at the time of its release, it is now hailed as a seminal classic in hip-hop and many see it as an underrated album.

Tougher Than Leather peaked at number 9 on the US Billboard 200, and number 2 on the Top R&B/Hip Hop Albums chart. The album was certified Platinum by the RIAA on July 19, 1988.

The album features three the Billboard singles: "Run's House", "Mary, Mary" and "I'm Not Going Out Like That". "Run's House" and "Mary, Mary" also hit the UK Singles Chart.

The album was reissued by Arista Records in 1999 and 2003. An expanded and remastered edition was released in 2005 and contained 4 previously unreleased songs.

Background
The platinum-selling album, a follow-up to the group's big commercial breakthrough album 1986's Raising Hell, featured some of the group's classics like "Run's House", "Beats to the Rhyme", and a cover of The Monkees's "Mary, Mary". Tougher Than Leather was the group's fourth effort and blended in elements of not only rap but also rock n' roll and funk, making it their most varied effort to date alongside King of Rock.  "Papa Crazy" is based on "Papa Was a Rollin' Stone" by The Temptations. The album was recorded at 5 studios in New York City: Chung King House Of Metal, Unique Recording Studios, Inc., Electric Lady Studios, Ian London Studios, Greene St. Recording.

In response to albums such as Eric B. & Rakim's Paid In Full, Public Enemy's It Takes A Nation Of Millions To Hold Us Back, and Boogie Down Productions' Criminal Minded and By All Means Necessary, the group made a distinct departure from their earlier work, as Jam-Master Jay used a heavier amount of sampling.

Run and DMC also made changes in their rapping style (heavily influenced by Rakim) as techniques such as alliteration, polysyllabic rhyming, and internal rhyme are found in songs like "I'm Not Going Out Like That," "Radio Station", and the title track. The group also introduces storytelling to their arsenal in "Ragtime". Despite this, Run-D.M.C. does not abandon their formula of combining hip-hop beats with hard rock guitar riffs, using it in "Miss Elaine", the title track, "Soul To Rock And Roll", and "Mary, Mary".

Film
The album was accompanied by the release of a crime film of the same name by New Line Cinema with Rick Rubin as a director and starring Run-D.M.C. According to the plot Run-D.M.C. must find and punish the evil drug lord-record company executive who murdered their friend. Along the way, they encounter racist bikers, blonde bimbos, and the Beastie Boys. The film was released on September 16, 1988, and was panned by critics.

Track listing
The information about samples was taken from WhoSampled.

Deluxe edition bonus tracks 
The information about bonus tracks was taken from a booklet of 2005 expanded deluxe edition.

Charts

Weekly charts

Year-end charts

Certifications

References

External links
 Tougher Than Leather at Discogs
 Tougher Than Leather at RapGenius
 Review of video, Video Review, Jan. 1989
 Tougher Than Leather (film) at the Internet Movie Database

1988 albums
Run-DMC albums
Profile Records albums
Albums produced by Rick Rubin
Albums recorded at Chung King Studios
Albums recorded at Electric Lady Studios
Albums recorded at Greene St. Recording